Seel may refer to:

People 
 Adolf Seel (1829–1907), German painter
 Cache Seel, the deck boss and only survivor of the FV Big Valley, which sank on January 15, 2005
 Charles Seel (1897–1980), American actor
 Karen Seel, commissioner in District 5, Pinellas County, FL
 Pierre Seel (1923–2005), only French person to have testified openly about his experience of deportation during World War II due to his homosexuality
 Steve Seel (born 1966), American disc jockey for 89.3 The Current in the Twin Cities, Minnesota
 Wolfgang Seel (born 1948), German footballer

Places 
 Seel, Indonesia
 Seel Park, the home ground of the English football club Mossley A.F.C.
 Keet Seel, a cliff dwelling in the Navajo National Monument
 10039 Keet Seel (1Butv
984 LK), a main-belt asteroid named after the cliff dwelling

Other uses 
 Seel (Pokémon), a fictional species of Pokémon
 Seeling, a falconry training technique in which a bird was temporarily blinded by sewing its eyes shut; see Medieval hunting

See also
 Seal (disambiguation)